TSFL may refer to:

 Tasmanian State Football League, Australian football league
 Texas Sixman Football League, American football league